Nittha Khuhapremkit (born 21 September 1990), formerly Nittha Jirayungyurn, or nickname Mew is a Thai actress and model who is under Channel 3 Thailand. Her first drama is Khun Chai Pawornruj as Thanying Wanrasa and she was paired with Prin Suparat for the popular drama My Husband in Law. Until now, she has acted in several dramas for Channel 3 Thailand.

Early life and education
She was born on 21 September 1990 in Bangkok, Thailand. She went to Sacred Heart School during her primary school days and went to St. Joseph School on her high school days. She graduated from Srinakharinwirot University with major in Fashion Design. In 2016, she starred her first movie, One Day paired with Chantavit Dhanasevi.

Personal life 
She married Tharaphut Kuhapremkit, a businessman and heir to a gold-trading family, at the end of December 2019, and the wedding ceremony took place in early January 2020.

On September 12, 2021, She gave birth to a baby girl named Marin Kuhapremkit.

Filmography

Film

Television series

Music video appearance

Advertising

Master of Ceremony: MC

Concert 
 2017 : LOVE IS IN THE AIR : CHANNEL3 CHARITY CONCERT, with all Channel 3 actors.

Awards and nominations

References

External links
 
 

1990 births
Living people
Nittha Jirayungyurn
Nittha Jirayungyurn
Nittha Jirayungyurn
Nittha Jirayungyurn
Nittha Jirayungyurn
Nittha Jirayungyurn
Nittha Jirayungyurn
Nittha Jirayungyurn